Stop may refer to:

Places
Stop, Kentucky, an unincorporated community in the United States
 Stop (Rogatica), a village in Rogatica, Republika Srpska, Bosnia and Herzegovina

Facilities
 Bus stop
 Truck stop, a type of rest stop for truck drivers
 Rail stop, colloquialism for a railway station

Film 
 Stop, a 1970 American film by Bill Gunn with Marlene Clark, Anna Aries, Edward Michael Bell 
 Stop, a 1972 French-Canadian film by Jean Beaudin

 Stop!, a 2004 Hindi romantic film starring Dia Mirza
 Stop (2015 film) South Korean-Japanese co-production directed by Kim Ki-duk

Music 
 Double stop, the act of playing two notes simultaneously
 Organ stop, a component of a pipe organ
 Stop (Stockhausen), a composition for orchestra by Karlheinz Stockhausen

Albums 
 Stop (Don Lanphere album), and the title song, 1983
 Stop (Eric Burdon Band album), and the title song, 1975
 Stop (Franco De Vita album), 2004
 Stop (Plain White T's album), and the title song, 2001
 Stop! (album), by Sam Brown, and the title song, 1988

Songs 
 "Stop!" (Against Me! song)
 "Stop" (Bang song)
 "Stop!" (Jane's Addiction song)
 "Stop" (Omar Naber song), the Slovene entry to the Eurovision Song Contest 2005
 "Stop" (Pink Floyd song)
 "Stop" (Ryan Adams song)
 "Stop!" (Sam Brown song)
 "Stop" (Sibel Redžep song)
 "Stop" (Spice Girls song)
 "Stop" (Stefanie Heinzmann song), recorded in 2009
 "Stop! In the Name of Love", a song by the Supremes
 "Stop", by AJ Mitchell
 "Stop", by Black Rebel Motorcycle Club from Take Them On, On Your Own
 "Stop", by Clyde McPhatter, B-side of the single "The Best Man Cried"
 "Stop", by Dope from Life
 "Stop", by En Vogue from Soul Flower
 "Stop!", by Erasure from Crackers International 
 "Stop", by Girls Aloud from Sound of the Underground
 "Stop", by J-Hope from Jack in the Box
 "Stop", by James Gang from Yer' Album
 "Stop", by Matchbox Twenty from Mad Season
 "Stop", by Mega City Four from Sebastopol Rd.
 "Stop", by No Angels from Welcome to the Dance
 "Stop", by Stefanie Heinzmann from Roots to Grow
 "Stop", by Twin Sister from "In Heaven"

Medicine and anatomy 
 Stop (dog), a part of a dog's skull
 Stop codon, a type of RNA molecule in genetic code
 STOP protein, a protein in animals
Surgical termination of pregnancy, a type of abortion

Linguistics
Stop consonant, a type of consonant in which you block the flow of air for a moment and suddenly release it. Also known as a plosive or an occlusive.

Optics and photography 
 Stop, the difference of a power of 2 in the context of exposure value
 F-stops, a unit of measure of aperture
 Stop bath, a chemical used in film processing

Arrestation devices
 Door stop
 Petzl Stop, a descender used in caving
 Train stop, a train protection device

Halting 
 Stop sign, a traffic signal
 Full stop (full point, period), a punctuation mark
 STOP, used to replace that symbol in telegraphs, as Morse code has no method to produce it (sometimes STOP was used for a comma and FULL STOP for the period).
 Stop error, a computer error screen
 Terry stop, a brief police detention in the United States

Other uses
 Safe Tables Our Priority, a food safety organization
 Secure Trusted Operating Program, a computer operating system
 Stop, a futuristic display typeface by Aldo Novarese
 Stop squark, in quantum physics, a supersymmetric squark which is the superpartner of the top quark
 Society of Teachers Opposed to Physical Punishment, an organisation based in the United Kingdom
 Strategic Operations, a military, police, and medical training company in San Diego
 Stop or stopper, a specific type of card holding in one suit in the game of contract bridge (see: Glossary of contract bridge terms#stopper)

See also

 
 
 Stopper (disambiguation)
 Halt (disambiguation)